"Diamond in the Dust" is a song co-written and recorded by American country music artist Mark Gray.  It was released in October 1984 as the first single from the album This Ol' Piano.  The song reached #9 on the Billboard Hot Country Singles & Tracks chart.  The song was written by Gray and Sonny LeMaire.

Chart performance

References

1984 singles
Mark Gray (singer) songs
Songs written by Mark Gray (singer)
Songs written by Sonny LeMaire
Song recordings produced by Steve Buckingham (record producer)
Columbia Records singles
1984 songs